Charles Timmins (29 May 1922 – 13 April 2010) was an English footballer.

Born in Birmingham, Timmins signed for Birmingham City before the Second World War. However, his registration papers were lost after heavy bombing in the Birmingham area. In the summer of 1948, Timmins signed for Coventry City.

Timmins had given up hope of pursuing a career in top-flight football and was playing for non-league Jack Moulds Athletic in Birmingham when Coventry manager Harry Storer turned up unannounced at the Timmins family home and persuaded him to sign for Coventry City. Timmins spent 11 years at Coventry, including three years as club captain. During the 1955–56 season, Timmins was touted by press as the "best full back outside the top flight" and speculation grew that he would join teammate Reg Matthews in the England squad. Coventry turned down a substantial bid from Newcastle United for Timmins during his time at Highfield Road. He played a total of 165 games (161 in the Football League) and scored five goals before leaving Coventry to join Leamington in 1959, aged 37.

Timmins then spent the 1960–61 season coaching Evesham United before finally retiring aged 39. Timmins was a member of the Coventry City Former Players Association and was a regular at the club's official 'Legends' Days. After retiring from football, he worked for the Rover service department in Solihull and played for the works team.

Timmins was diagnosed with prostate cancer and died at the Queen Elizabeth Hospital, Birmingham, during the early hours of 13 April 2010.

References

1922 births
2010 deaths
Footballers from Birmingham, West Midlands
English footballers
Association football defenders
Coventry City F.C. players
Leamington F.C. players
Deaths from prostate cancer
Deaths from cancer in England